Mill Village Historic District may refer to:

Mill Village Historic District (Williamstown, Massachusetts), listed on the NRHP in Massachusetts
Mill Village Historic District (Tupelo, Mississippi), listed on the NRHP in Mississippi
Mill Village Historic District (Waterbury, Vermont), listed on the NRHP in Vermont

Other districts by state
Mandeville Mills and Mill Village Historic District, Carrollton, GA, listed on the NRHP in Georgia
ATCO-Goodyear Mill and Mill Village Historic District, Cartersville, GA, listed on the NRHP in Georgia
Covington Mills and Mill Village Historic District, Covington, GA, listed on the NRHP in Georgia
Stark Mill and Mill Village Historic District, Hogansville, GA, listed on the NRHP in Georgia
Newnan Cotton Mill and Mill Village Historic District, Newnan, GA, listed on the NRHP in Georgia
Jerusalem Mill Village, Jerusalem, MD, listed on the NRHP in Maryland
Howland Mill Village Historic District, New Bedford, MA, listed on the NRHP in Massachusetts
Stonewall Mill Village Historic District, Stonewall, MS, listed on the NRHP in Mississippi
Alamance Mill Village Historic District, Alamance, NC, listed on the NRHP in North Carolina
Bellemont Mill Village Historic District, Bellemont, NC, listed on the NRHP in North Carolina
Pearl Mill Village Historic District, Durham, NC, listed on the NRHP in North Carolina
Alexander Manufacturing Company Mill Village Historic District, Forest City, NC, listed on the NRHP in North Carolina
Glencoe Mill Village Historic District, Glencoe, NC, listed on the NRHP in North Carolina
Oakdale Cotton Mill Village, Jamestown, NC, listed on the NRHP in North Carolina
Erlanger Mill Village Historic District, Lexington, NC, listed on the NRHP in North Carolina
Glen Royall Mill Village Historic District, Wake Forest, NC, listed on the NRHP in North Carolina
Fetter's Mill Village Historic District, Byrn Athyn Borough, PA, listed on the NRHP in Pennsylvania
Berkeley Mill Village, Cumberland (Berkeley), RI, listed on the NRHP in Rhode Island
Hamilton Mill Village Historic District, North Kingstown, RI, listed on the NRHP in Rhode Island
Forestdale Mill Village Historic District, North Smithfield, RI, listed on the NRHP in Rhode Island
Granby Mill Village Historic District, Columbia, SC, listed on the NRHP in South Carolina
Vaucluse Mill Village Historic District, Vaucluse, SC, listed on the NRHP in South Carolina
Woodside Cotton Mill Village Historic District, Woodside, SC, listed on the NRHP in South Carolina